

The Caverio Map (also known as Caveri Map or Canerio Map) is a map drawn by Nicolay de Caveri or Caverio, circa 1506.
It is kept at the Bibliothèque Nationale de France in Paris. 

It is drawn on parchment by hand and coloured. It is composed of ten sections or panels, the whole forming a rectangle measuring 2.25 by 1.15 metres.  This undated map was one of the primary sources used to make the Waldseemüller map in  1507. On the basis of this it is mostly dated to c. 1506. 
The map is signed with "Nicolay de Caveri Januensis". It was probably either made in Lisbon by the Genoese Caveri, or copied by him in Genoa from a Portuguese map very similar to the Cantino map, albeit not the Cantino map itself. The Cantino map was in Genoa toward the end of 1502 and some authors have assumed that Caveri could have used it as the basis of his map, at least for portions of Greenland, Newfoundland, and Brazil coast. However, other regions of the Caverio planisphere derive from other sources. 

Sanz (1961) argued that the east coast of North America is drawn with surprising accuracy, especially "when we consider the general belief that the Europeans neither saw nor set foot on the beaches in the southern states of the present-day U.S.A. before Ponce de León arrived there in 1512 or 1513, Giovanni da Verrazzano in 1523, Lucas Vásquez de Ayllón in 1520-1524 or Esteban Gómez in 1525." However, if this map is influenced by the Cantino map as stated above, this is explained by the João Fernandes Labrador and Pedro de Barcelos explorations from 1495 and 1498, and again by John Cabot in 1498 under the orders of King Manuel I of Portugal. As well as the Brazilian coastline by Portuguese explorer Pedro Álvares Cabral exploration in 1500.

The inscription off the coast of vera cruz (America/Brazil) says: “The land called Vera Cruz was found by Pedro Alvares Cabral, a gentleman of the household of the King of Portugal. He discovered it as commander of a fleet of 14 ships that that King sent to Calicut, and on the way to India, he came across this land here, which he took to be terra firma [mainland] in which there are many people, described as going about, men and women, as naked as their mothers bore them; they are lighter-skinned." The inscription was drawn from the Cantino map.

See also
Early world maps
Piri Reis map

Notes

References
 Carlos Sanz, Mapas antiguos del mundo, Madrid, 1961.
 Gaspar, Joaquim A. (2012) 'Blunders, Errors and Entanglements: Scrutining the Cantino planisphere with a Cartometric Eye', Imago Mundi, Vol. 64, Part 2: 181-200

External links
Zoomable image of the Caverio map on the Bibliothèque Nationale de France website

Historic maps of the world
1505 works
Bibliothèque nationale de France collections
16th-century maps and globes